"Keeper of the Castle" is a song recorded and released by American singing group the Four Tops, notable as the first hit the group scored on the ABC-Dunhill label after leaving Motown in 1972. The song, a social commentary on men's roles in relationships, was co-written by Dennis Lambert, who also produced the song and other songs off their album of the same name.

Reception
Upon its release, the single peaked at number ten on the US pop chart and number seven on the R&B charts. Overseas, "Keeper of the Castle" peaked at number 18 on the UK singles chart.  It had a lesser showing in Canada, yet still reaching the Top 40 (#32).

Chart performance

Later uses
"Keeper of the Castle" was sampled in the 1973 break-in record, "Super Fly Meets Shaft" (US #31).

References

External links
 

1972 songs
1972 singles
Four Tops songs
Songs written by Brian Potter (musician)
Songs written by Dennis Lambert
ABC Records singles
Dunhill Records singles